Kallimathayam is a village located along Tiruppur-Dharapuram-Oddanchatram highway.

Kallimanthayam Village Panchayat falls under Thoppampatti Union and Oddanchatram taluk of Dindigul district, Tamil Nadu. Kallimanthayam is located 17.6 Km distance from Thoppampatti and 40.7 Km from Dindugal. It is bounded by Konrangi Keeranur in the west, Kolinjivadi in the north, Idaiyakottai in the east and Tangachiyammapatti in the south.

Kallimandayam Gram Panchayat
Kallimandhayam Gram Panchayat has eighteen small hamlets attached to it for administrative purposes.
Velayuthampalayam
Arranmanaivalasu
Esakaampatti
Thumbhichipalayam
Kootakkaaranputhur
C.Pongavalasu (rengapalayam)
P.Pongavalasu (kaliappagoundan patti)
Kallimandayam
Vangaarachinnapatti (thekkur)
Thoopakkavalasu
Sengaataanvalasu
Neelagoundanpatti
Malayandigoundanvalasu
Othaiyur village

Education
In Kallimandhayam there is one higher secondary school, ten government primary schools, and one middle school, including CSI High school and Tirupathi Arul Nery Hr. school, also a private school brindavan matric school. Kallimandhayam also has a primary health centre.

References

Villages in Dindigul district